The 1999 Faber Grand Prix was a women's tennis tournament played on indoor hardcourts in Hannover, Germany that was part of Tier II of the 1999 WTA Tour. It was the seventh edition of the tournament and was held from 15 February until 21 February 1999. First-seeded Jana Novotná won the singles title and earned $80,000 first-prize money.

Finals

Singles

 Jana Novotná defeated  Venus Williams, 6–4, 6–4
 It was Novotná's 1st singles title of the year and the 24th and last of her career.

Doubles

 Serena Williams /  Venus Williams defeated  Alexandra Fusai /  Nathalie Tauziat, 5–7, 6–2, 6–2

Entrants

Seeds

Other entrants
The following players received wildcards into the singles main draw:
  Andrea Glass
  Jennifer Capriati
  Sabine Appelmans

The following players received wildcards into the doubles main draw:
  Jennifer Capriati /  Steffi Graf

The following players received entry from the qualifying draw:

  Émilie Loit
  Anne-Gaëlle Sidot
  Karina Habšudová
  Barbara Rittner

The following player received entry as a lucky loser:

  Miriam Oremans

References

External links
 ITF tournament edition details
 Tournament draws

Faber Grand Prix
Faber Grand Prix
1999 in German women's sport
Faber